Entertainment Studios Networks is a group of seven high-definition cable networks operated by Entertainment Studios Inc., a company owned by and featuring comedian Byron Allen.

The seven networks include Cars.TV, Comedy.TV, ES.TV, Justice Central, MyDestination.TV, Pets.TV and Recipe.TV. All the shows appearing on the networks are produced and distributed exclusively by Entertainment Studios, but are also distributed in traditional broadcast syndication, to some controversy by cable providers who have rejected carriage of the networks under those grounds as providing low customer value when those programs are all available on traditional television stations. In addition, Byron Allen in early 2018 acquired The Weather Channel, which remained mainly under carriage agreements under its old management, along with its own separate corporate structure, but now comes under the same carriage agreement with ESN and Allen Media, Byron Allen's broadcast stations group.

History
The networks were launched in May 2009 through a deal with Verizon FIOS and have since expanded to several other pay-TV services. The networks are also offered direct-to-consumer through a Roku/Amazon Fire TV channel known as "SmartTV.com".

On March 22, 2018, Byron Allen's Entertainment Studios announced its intent to acquire The Weather Channel's television assets from an NBCUniversal/Blackstone Group partnership. The actual value is undisclosed, but was reported to be around $300 million; the channel's non-television assets, which were separately sold to IBM two years prior, were not included in the sale. Likewise, the regional sports networks Entertainment Studios is purchasing in conjunction with Sinclair Broadcast Group, Bally Sports (formerly Fox Sports Networks), will be operated in a separate venture, Diamond Sports Ventures.

Ratings
As of the end of 2017, only two of the channels in the suite, Justice Central and Comedy.TV, maintained a nightly Nielsen average enough to tabulate a rating, while the others five had such a low sample size, they unable to be rated; the two channels also are regularly among the least rated Nielsen-measured networks in the United States. ESN has since classed the other five networks together as one unit known as "ESN Lifestyle" for ratings purposes to allow Nielsen classification, though this has not been reflected on-air.

As of 2019, Comedy.TV was the lowest-rated network measured by Nielsen, with an average of 1,000 primetime viewers. Justice Central had the highest viewership among Allen networks, averaging 11,000 viewers. The remaining five channels have a combined average of 3,000 viewers.

Channels

Cars.TV - dedicated to notable cars, showcasing the collectors, designers, innovators, and ultimate car enthusiasts.
Comedy.TV - comedians performing live and taped, as well as hosted talk and variety shows; such as Comics Unleashed with Byron Allen and Comedy.tv.
ES.TV - entertainment news, variety shows, and celebrity profiles.
Justice Central - reruns of Entertainment Studios' court shows America's Court with Judge Ross, We the People With Gloria Allred, and Justice for All with Judge Cristina Pérez.
MyDestination.TV - dedicated to showcasing exotic destinations around the world, and Beautiful Homes & Great Estates
Pets.TV - dedicated to pets and pet lovers, celebrating the best in show and the people who love them.
Recipe.TV - showcasing chefs, recipes, food and cuisine from around the world.

Carriage lawsuits

On December 3, 2014, a $10 billion racial discrimination lawsuit was filed against AT&T's U-verse division and DirecTV by the National Association of African American Owned Media (NAAAOM) for allegedly violating the Civil Rights Act of 1866. NAAAOM is headed by Entertainment Studios Vice-President Mark DeVitre. The lawsuit claimed that Entertainment Studio Networks were denied carriage by the two providers on racial concerns. In December 2015, AT&T and DirecTV (by then part of AT&T) reached a settlement with Entertainment Studios to carry the networks, with Comedy and Justice Central carried on DirecTV, and Comedy, Recipe, ES, MyDestination, Cars and Pets added to U-verse, along with Justice Central's existing carriage.

The same type of lawsuit, again for $10 billion, was filed against Charter on January 28, 2016, which seeks carriage as part of Charter's merger with Time Warner Cable and Bright House Networks into the front-facing Spectrum brand. Charter and Comcast (which had a separate $20 billion suit filed against them by Entertainment Studios and NAAOM) filed an appeal to dismiss the lawsuit in the United States Court of Appeals for the Ninth Circuit on First Amendment grounds, which was dismissed by the 9th Circuit on November 19, 2018, allowing the two suits to go forward to trial.

Comcast successfully petitioned the Supreme Court of the United States for writ of certiorari to challenge the Ninth Circuit's decision, which the Court granted in June 2019. In March 2020, the Supreme Court issued a 9-0 unanimous decision agreeing with Comcast that Allen must meet the high bar under the 1866 Civil Rights Act and prove that Comcast would have carried his channel "but for" his race. The court sent the case back to the 9th Circuit of reconsideration. In June 2020, Comcast and Allen settled the lawsuit and came to a broader agreement to carry Allen's broadcast stations and the Weather Channel, along with three of the ESN networks.

Charter settled their lawsuit with Allen on February 4, 2021, out-of-court for undisclosed terms. Spectrum systems thus added four ESN networks (Pets, Cars, Recipe, and Justice Central) at the start of May 2021.

See also
Entertainers with Byron Allen, ESN's flagship program

References

External links

Television channels and stations established in 2009
Cable network groups in the United States
Entertainment Studios